Protected areas of Australia include Commonwealth and off-shore protected areas managed by the Australian government, as well as protected areas within each of the six states of Australia and two self-governing territories, the Australian Capital Territory and the Northern Territory, which are managed by the eight state and territory governments.

Commonwealth and off-shore protected areas in the Australian Capital Territory, the Northern Territory, the Christmas Island Territory, the Cocos (Keeling) Islands Territory, the Norfolk Island Territory and the Australian Antarctic Territory are managed by Director of National Parks, an agency within the Department of the Environment and Energy, with the exception of the Great Barrier Reef Marine Park, which is managed by the Great Barrier Reef Marine Park Authority, a separate body within the department.

 protected areas cover  of Australia's land area, or about 19.75% of the total land area. The Australian Capital Territory has the highest level of protection at nearly 56% of its territory, followed by Tasmania with 42% and South Australia with 30%. The lowest level of protection is in Queensland and New South Wales with 8.71% and 9.61% respectively. Of all protected areas, two-thirds are considered strictly protected (IUCN categories I to IV), and the rest is mostly managed resources protected area (IUCN category VI). Over 43% of the protected area in Australia is publicly owned and managed by the Australian government or state and territory governments. The second-largest component of protected areas are the Indigenous Protected Areas, at over 44% and growing .

Protected areas managed by the Australian government
The following list shows only the Commonwealth and off-shore protected areas that are managed by the Australian government which represents a small portion of all protected areas located in Australia. Each state and territory is responsible for the management of the protected areas under its jurisdiction with exception to protected areas such as the Uluru-Kata Tjuta National Park in the Northern Territory.  The majority of Australian protected areas are managed by the state and territory governments.

National Parks
The following protected areas which are designated as national parks are managed by the Australian government and in some instances in conjunction with indigenous land owners:

 Booderee (owned by the Wreck Bay Aboriginal Community and co-managed)
 Christmas Island
 Kakadu
 Norfolk Island
 Pulu Keeling
 Uluru-Kata Tjuta

Australia's first national park - and the second in the world - is Royal National Park in New South Wales, established in 1879.

National Heritage List

The National Heritage List is a heritage register, a list of national heritage places deemed to be of outstanding heritage significance to Australia, established in 2003. The list includes natural and historic places, including those of cultural significance to Indigenous Australians. Once on the National Heritage List the provisions of the Environment Protection and Biodiversity Conservation Act 1999 apply. Some of these also form part of the World Heritage Sites listed in a separate section below.

Botanical Gardens
 Australian National
 Booderee (owned by the Wreck Bay Aboriginal Community and co-managed)
 Norfolk Island

Antarctic Specially Protected Areas

As of 2014 there are 12 Antarctic Specially Protected Areas
 Amanda Bay
 Ardery Island and Odbert Island
 Clark Peninsula
 Frazier Islands
 Hawker Island
 Marine Plain
 Mawson's Huts
 North-eastern Bailey Peninsula
 Rookery Islands
 Scullin and Murray Monoliths
 Stornes
 Taylor Rookery

Antarctic Specially Managed Areas

As of 2014 there is 1 Antarctic Specially Managed Area
 Larsemann Hills

Commonwealth Marine reserves

The Australian Government manages an estate of marine protected areas  known as Commonwealth marine reserves (CMR) which was established under the Environment Protection and Biodiversity Conservation Act 1999 (EPBC Act). These marine reserves are in Australian waters, but not state or territory waters. A majority of the reserves are not in effect until new managements plans are released following a review of reserves established in 2012.

In addition to the Coral Sea CMR and the Heard Island and McDonald Islands CMR, there are a further 57 Commonwealth marine reserves grouped into 5 geographical regions called Commonwealth marine reserve networks:

 North network (8 reserves)
 North-west network (13 reserves)
 Temperate East network (8 reserves)
 South-east network (14 reserves)
 South-west network (14 reserves)

Calperum and Taylorville Stations

Calperum and Taylorville Stations are pastoral leases located next to each other near Renmark in South Australia and which were purchased for conservation purposes using both private and Australian government funds.  Calperum Station was purchased by the Chicago Zoological Society in 1993 while Taylorville Station was purchased by the Australian Landscape Trust in 2000 with the ownership of both leases being deeded to the Director of National Parks.  Both properties are managed by the Australian Landscape Trust.

Protection arising from Australian government policy and international obligations

World Heritage listed areas 

, the following sites are listed by UNESCO as World Heritage Sites:
 Australian Fossil Mammal Sites (Riversleigh, Qld and Naracoorte, SA)
 Australian Convict Sites, consisting of 11 remnant sites
Budj Bim Cultural Landscape, Vic
 Fraser Island, Qld
 Gondwana Rainforests of Australia, formerly Central Eastern Rainforest Reserves
 Great Barrier Reef, Qld
 Greater Blue Mountains Area, NSW
 Heard and McDonald Islands, Antarctica
 Kakadu National Park, NT
 Lord Howe Island
 Macquarie Island
 Ningaloo Coast, WA
 Purnululu National Park, WA
 Royal Exhibition Building and Carlton Gardens
 Shark Bay, WA
 Sydney Opera House
 Tasmanian Wilderness
 Uluru-Kata Tjuta National Park, NT
 Wet Tropics of Queensland
 Willandra Lakes Region, NSW

Indigenous protected areas

Biosphere reserves

The following biosphere reserves belonging to the UNESCO World Biosphere Reserve program are located within Australia:

 Croajingolong, Victoria (1977)
 Riverland, South Australia (1977)
 Kosciuszko, New South Wales (1977)
 Prince Regent River, Western Australia (1977)
 Mamungari (formerly Unnamed), South Australia (1977)
 Uluru (Ayers Rock-Mount Olga), Northern Territory (1977)
 Yathong (1977)
 Fitzgerald River, Western Australia (1978)
Hattah-Kulkyne and Murray-Kulkyne, Victoria (1981)
 Wilsons Promontory, Victoria (1981)
 Mornington Peninsula and Western Port, Victoria (2002)
 Barkindji, New South Wales (2005)
 Noosa, Queensland (2007)
 Great Sandy, Queensland (2009)

Ramsar sites

As a contracting party to the Convention on Wetlands of International Importance (known as the Ramsar Convention), Australia is encouraged "to nominate sites containing representative, rare or unique wetlands, or that are important for conserving biological diversity, to the List of Wetlands of International Importance".  As of March 2014, the Australian Government has nominated 65 Ramsar sites.

Management by Australian states and territories
 Protected areas of the Australian Capital Territory
 Protected areas of New South Wales
 Protected areas of the Northern Territory
 Protected areas of Queensland
 Protected areas of South Australia
 Protected areas of Tasmania
 Protected areas of Victoria
 Protected areas of Western Australia

Other conservation organisations
There is a number of private and government organisations involved in conservation in Australia.

See also
 Australia's National Reserve System
 Australian Whale Sanctuary
 Conservation park (Australia)
 List of national parks of Australia
 Wild Rivers

References

External links 
 Department of the Environment,Australia
 The Director of National Parks
 Parks Australia
 Great Barrier Reef Marine Park Authority

 

de:Nationalparks in Australien
it:Aree protette dell'Australia Occidentale